Mohanlal is an Indian actor, producer, distributor, television host and playback singer who has starred in both mainstream blockbuster and art house films. During his career, he has appeared in more than 350+ feature films, primarily in Malayalam cinema, and also in Tamil, Hindi, Telugu, and Kannada films.

In 1978, when he was 18, he started acting with a minor comedic role in the unreleased film Thiranottam, before making his screen debut in 1980 as an antagonist in the romance film Manjil Virinja Pookkal. His portrayal of Narendran, a sadistic husband, received recognition and the film developed a cult status in Malayalam cinema. Subsequently, Mohanlal was cast as the antagonist in many films. His first positive role was in Padayottam (1982), the first 70 mm film in Malayalam. It was 1983's Aattakalasam that gave him stardom. In 1984 he starred in Poochakkoru Mookkuthi, a comedy film whose success triggered a trend and popularised the genre in the 1980s. In an early critically acclaimed performance, Mohanlal played an antihero in the I. V. Sasi-directed thriller Uyarangalil (1984). In the same year, he co-founded Casino Films, a motion picture production company which later produced his popular comedies Gandhinagar 2nd Street (1986) and Nadodikkattu (1987).

As a playback singer, Mohanlal contributed his first song "Sindhoora Megham" to Onnanam Kunnil Oradi Kunnil (1985). In 1986, he established a career record by starring in 34 films in one year. Also in 1986, he became the youngest winner of the Kerala State Film Award for Best Actor at age 26 for the comedy-drama T. P. Balagopalan M.A., a record he held until 2006. The same year he co-founded Cheers Films, a second production company. Mohanlal's stardom catapulted with the success of the crime drama Rajavinte Makan (1986). In Irupatham Noottandu (1987), he portrayed mobster Sagar Alias Jacky  which became a cult figure in crime dramas ever since its release. His tragicomedy Chithram (1988) ran continuously for 58 weeks in one theatre, a record still unbroken in Malayalam cinema. In 1989, his performance in Kireedam earned him a Special Jury Mention at the 37th National Film Awards.

In 1990, Mohanlal founded his own film production company, Pranavam Arts. Its debut, musical thriller His Highness Abdullah, garnered critical acclaim and became the year's highest-grossing film. His second production, Bharatham (1991), earned him the National Film Award for Best Actor and Forbes India included it on its list of "25 Greatest Acting Performances in Indian Cinema". His spiritual fantasy, Guru (1997), was the first Malayalam film submitted by India for the American Academy Award for Best Foreign Language Film. In 1997, he received critical praise for his first leading role in a non-Malayalam film—the Mani Ratnam-directed Tamil film Iruvar. Vanaprastham, which was screened at the Un Certain Regard section in the 1999 Cannes Film Festival, earned him the National Film Awards for Best Actor and Best Film (Producer).

In 2000, Mohanlal's action drama, Narasimham, became the highest-grossing Malayalam film at the time. His character Induchoodan has since attracted a cult following. In 2001, he portrayed Karna in his theatrical debut, Karnabharam, directed by Kavalam Narayana Panicker. In 2003, he earned an International Indian Film Academy Award for Best Supporting Actor for his role in the Bollywood film Company. In 2005, he starred in the Bejoy Nambiar-directed short silent film Reflections. His critically acclaimed portrayal of an Alzhiemers patient in Thanmathra (2005) earned him an honorary award from the Indian Medical Association. The Indian Territorial Army bestowed him with the honorary rank of lieutenant colonel for his performance as Major Mahadevan in the war film Keerthi Chakra (2006) and its sequel Kurukshetra (2008). In 2008, he starred in Twenty:20, a landmark film which starred almost all actors in the guild of Malayalam film actors  AMMA. Drishyam (2013), in which he portrayed an ordinary man, became the highest-grossing Malayalam film of all time. In 2016, he acted in the title role in the action film Pulimurugan; it became the highest-grossing Malayalam film ever and is the first Malayalam film to gross over 150 crore at the box office. In 2019, he acted in Prithviraj Sukumaran's directorial Lucifer, beat Pulimurugan to become the highest-grossing Malayalam film. His directorial debut, the 3D film Barroz: Guardian of D'Gama's Treasure is in pre-production.

Films in Malayalam

Films in other languages

Director

Narrator / voice-over

Television

Theatre

Short films

Radio drama

See also 
 Awards and nominations received by Mohanlal
 Songs recorded by Mohanlal

Notes

References 

Indian filmographies
Male actor filmographies